Amanda Siebert is a Canadian author. She wrote The Little Book of Cannabis in 2018, the bestselling nonfiction book about cannabis in Canada as of early 2019. Siebert is a former cannabis columnist for The Georgia Straight, and shared the Canadian Association of Journalists' Don McGillivray Award, given for the "top investigative journalism completed by Canadian media", with coauthor Travis Lupick for their 2016 writing about fentanyl abuse in Vancouver, and she won the Jack Webster Award for excellence in feature/enterprise reporting – print in 2017. Siebert's November 20, 2018 pro-legalization of cannabis op-ed in The New York Times and her authorship of The Little Book of Cannabis were noted by Nonprofit Quarterly.

Bibliography

References

Sources

21st-century Canadian non-fiction writers
21st-century Canadian women writers
Cannabis writers
Living people
Year of birth missing (living people)